The Dance of Death is a 1969 film version of the 1900 play The Dance of Death by August Strindberg as presented by the National Theatre Company. It stars Laurence Olivier and Geraldine McEwan. The play was directed by Glen Byam Shaw, and the film version was directed by David Giles. Olivier reprised the role of Edgar, Geraldine reprised her role of Alice, but Robert Stephens, who played Kurt, was replaced by Robert Lang.

Previous filmed National Theatre productions include Uncle Vanya (1963) and Othello (1965). Both of these are available on DVD; however, as of 2017, The Dance of Death has never been released on DVD or video.

Plot
An egocentric artillery Captain and his venomous wife engage in savage unremitting battles in their isolated island fortress off the coast of Sweden at the turn of the century. Alice, a former actress who sacrificed her career for secluded military life with Edgar, reveals on the occasion of their 25th wedding anniversary, the veritable hell their marriage has been. Edgar, an aging schizophrenic who refuses to acknowledge his severe illness, struggles to sustain his ferocity and arrogance with an animal disregard for other people. Sensing that Alice, together with her cousin and would-be lover, Kurt, may ally against him, retaliates with vicious force. Alice lures Kurt into the illusion of sharing a passionate assignation and recruits him in a plot to destroy Edgar.

Cast
Laurence Olivier as Edgar
Geraldine McEwan as Alice
Robert Lang as Kurt
Janina Faye as Judith
Malcolm Reynolds as Allan
Jeanne Watts as Old Woman
Peter Penry-Jones asa Lieutenant
Maggie Riley as Karen
Carolyn Jones as Jenny
Frederick Pyne as Sentry
Barry James as Sentry
David Ryall as Sentry

References

External links
 

1969 films
1969 drama films
Films based on works by August Strindberg
British drama films
British films based on plays
Films set in the 1900s
Films set on islands
Films set in the Baltic Sea
Films set in Sweden
1970s English-language films
1960s English-language films
1960s British films
1970s British films